The Betsy is a 1978 American romantic drama film directed by Daniel Petrie, from a screenplay by William Bast and Walter Bernstein, based on the 1971 novel of the same name by Harold Robbins. It stars Laurence Olivier as a retired auto tycoon, with Robert Duvall, Katharine Ross, Tommy Lee Jones, and Jane Alexander in supporting roles.

The film was theatrically released in the United States on February 9, 1978, by Allied Artists and United Artists. Robbins considered The Betsy the best movie adaptation of any of his works.

Plot 
A fading family-owned automobile manufacturer and its owners pin their hopes for a return to profitability on a new model named for the great-granddaughter of the firm's founder.

The aging Loren Hardeman Sr. remains the titular head of a Detroit automotive conglomerate. (An obvious parallel exists between this fictional character and that of Henry Ford.) His grandson, Loren Hardeman III, now runs the company as president, but has diversified into other fields and is concerned that the auto division is not as lucrative as it once was and might even need to be eliminated.

A young auto racer, Angelo Perino, has been secretly commissioned to develop a groundbreaking fuel-efficient car. He juggles romantic relationships with a British royal, Lady Bobby Ayres, and the young Betsy, who is about to turn 21 and inherit a fortune, including the new car that her great-grandfather is naming in her honor.

Loren Hardeman III bitterly despises Hardeman Sr., who once carried on an affair with Loren's mother. The older Hardeman is not the man he used to be, but he is not ready to step aside forever.

Cast
 Laurence Olivier as Loren Hardeman Sr.
 Tommy Lee Jones as Angelo Perino
 Robert Duvall as Loren Hardeman III
 Katharine Ross as Sally Hardeman
 Jane Alexander as Alicia Hardeman
 Lesley-Anne Down as Lady Ayres
 Kathleen Beller as Betsy
 Joseph Wiseman as Jake Weinstein
 Edward Herrmann as Dan Weyman
 Paul Ryan Rudd as Loren Hardeman Jr.
 Charlie Fields as young Loren Hardeman III

Production
Assembly-plant footage was filmed at the American Motors (AMC) Kenosha, Wisconsin factory. It shows construction and painting of 1978 Gremlin, Pacer, and Concord models on AMC's assembly line serving as the factory of the fictitious Bethlehem Motors. For authenticity, the film's producers learned from AMC about how new cars are developed. The titular car is a slightly modified 1974 Lancia Beta coupe.

The Betsy features music composed by John Barry. It was filmed at Rosecliff mansion in Newport, Rhode Island.

A review by automobile industry expert Alex Taylor noted that the filmmakers did not show believable characters and realistic dialogue. Attempts by Hollywood to capture the auto industry on film, such as The Betsy, have "aimed at realistic drama but wound up with suds."

By 1978 there had been a notable increase in the construction of racquetball courts in the United States, so Petrie chose to shoot a scene in a company racquetball court during the first meeting between the characters played by Tommy Lee Jones and Robert Duvall.

Reception
The film opened in 473 theaters and grossed a record opening weekend for Allied Artists of $2,727,084. The film earned rentals of $7.85 million in the United States and Canada.

Most of the reviews of the film were negative. Chicago Tribune reviewer Gene Siskel offered a damning critique of the film: 

The Boston Evening Globe correspondent Michael Blowen described it as "a Reader's Digest condensation of a television soap opera." In the New York Daily News, Rex Reed stated that "the temptation to compare The Betsy with the Edsel stretches from here to deadline, but this movie is so bad, so numbingly obtuse, so bloatedly pretentious and awesomely corny, no capsule put-down seems adequate. It's The Damned, set in Grosse Pointe. Or, as Tennessee Williams might drawl, it's about 'a lotta things, honey—greed, lust, vice, homosexuality, incest, suicide, murder, and puttin' on airs.'"

The film appears in a chapter of Harry and Michael Medved's book The Golden Turkey Awards titled "The Worst Films Compendium from A (The Adventurers) to Z (Zontar: the Thing from Venus)". The Medveds wrote that "another Harold Robbins book bites the dust as a wretched, melodramatic film. Lord Laurence Olivier’s attempt at a Texas twang is a hilarious flop, as is his incestuous relationship with his daughter-in-law, Katharine Ross." The film is also listed in Golden Raspberry Award founder John Wilson's book The Official Razzie Movie Guide as one of the 100 Most Enjoyably Bad Movies Ever Made.

Notes

External links 
 
 
 
 
 

1978 films
1978 drama films
American auto racing films
American business films
American drama films
American Motors
Films about automobiles
Films based on American novels
Films scored by John Barry (composer)
Films directed by Daniel Petrie
Films set in Michigan
Allied Artists films
United Artists films
Films with screenplays by Walter Bernstein
Cars designed and produced for films
1970s business films
1970s English-language films
1970s American films